Homeobox protein Hox-A7 is a protein that in humans is encoded by the HOXA7 gene.

In vertebrates, the genes encoding the class of transcription factors called homeobox genes are found in clusters named A, B, C, and D on four separate chromosomes. Expression of these proteins is spatially and temporally regulated during embryonic development. This gene is part of the A cluster on chromosome 7 and encodes a DNA-binding transcription factor which may regulate gene expression, morphogenesis, and differentiation. For example, the encoded protein represses the transcription of differentiation-specific genes during keratinocyte proliferation, but this repression is then overcome by differentiation signals. This gene is highly similar to the antennapedia (Antp) gene of Drosophila.

See also
 Homeobox

References

Further reading

External links 
 

Transcription factors